This is a list of player transfers involving RFU Championship teams before or during the 2019–20 season. The list is of deals that are confirmed and are either from or to a rugby union team in the Championship during the 2018–19 season. It is not unknown for confirmed deals to be cancelled at a later date. On 19 April 2019, London Irish are promoted to the Premiership Rugby whilst Newcastle Falcons are relegated to the RFU Championship for the 2019-20 season. Ampthill are promoted to the RFU Championship, whilst Richmond are relegated to National League 1 for the 2019-20 season.

Ampthill

Players In
 Kwaku Asiedu from  Coventry
 Dave Ward from  Harlequins
 Darryl Veenendaal from  Nottingham
 Louis Grimoldby from  Massy
 Shay Kerry from  Oyonnax
 Serafin Bordoli from  Calvisano
 Facundo Dominguez from  Bueno Aires
 Jarryd Sage from  Dragons
 Henri Williams from  Dragons

Players Out
 Karl Garside to  Northampton Saints
 Paino Hehea retired
 James Pritchard retired
 Jack Culverhouse to  Cambridge

Bedford Blues

Players In
 Dan Temm from  Yorkshire Carnegie
 Matt Worley from  Northampton Saints
 Joe Atkinson from  Wasps
 Grayson Hart from  London Scottish
 Robbie Smith from  Glasgow Warriors
 Joe Wrafter from  Birmingham Moseley
 Sam Leeming from  Hartpury College
 Jordan Onojaife from  Ealing Trailfinders
 Alex Gliksten from  Saracens
 Charlie Reed from  Loughborough Students RUFC
 Henry Paul from  Esher
 Alafoti Fa'osiliva from  Worcester Warriors

Players Out
 Lee Dickson retired
 Ben Cooper to  Bury St Edmunds
 Camilo Parilli-Ocampo to  Chinnor
 Mark Flanagan retired
 Harry Sheppard to  London Scottish
 Hayden King to  Cornish Pirates
 Charlie Clare to  Leicester Tigers
 Jarad Williams to  Sale FC
 Alex Rae retired
 Chris Czekaj to  Merthyr
 Jake Sharp retired
 Justin Blanchet released
 Joe Britton released

Cornish Pirates

Players In
 Nicolas de Battista from  Zebre
 Jay Tyack from  Birmingham Moseley
 Ruaridh Dawson from  Newcastle Falcons
 Rhodri Davies from  Dragons
 Sam Rodman from  Jersey Reds
 Hayden King from  Bedford Blues
 Cian Romaine from  Yorkshire Carnegie
 Harry Davey from  Yorkshire Carnegie
 Jean-Baptiste Bruzulier from  Yorkshire Carnegie
 Antonio Kiri Kiri from  Yorkshire Carnegie
 Fa'atiga Lemalu from  Yorkshire Carnegie
 Craig Mitchell from  Yorkshire Carnegie
 Shae Tucker from  Hawke's Bay
 Suva Ma'asi from  Peterborough Lions

Players Out
 Christian Judge to  Bath
 Toby Freeman to  Harlequins
 Alex Day to  Saracens
 Dan Koster to  Hartpury College
 Tom Concu to  Old Elthamians
 Dan Lee to  Taunton
 Jake Ashby to  Chinnor
 Tyler Gendall retired
 Nodar Tcheishvili released
 Jordan Payne released

Coventry

Players In
 Gerard Ellis from  Dragons
 Will Owen from  Doncaster Knights
 Rory Jennings from  London Scottish
 Ryan Burrows from  Newcastle Falcons
 Senitiki Nayalo from  Edinburgh
 James Voss from  Leicester Tigers
 Gareth Denman from  Gloucester

 Dan Lewis promoted from Academy
 Scott Russell promoted from Academy
 Will Flinn promoted from Academy
 Andy Forsyth from  Yorkshire Carnegie
 Joe Buckle from  Yorkshire Carnegie
 David Langley from  Wasps
 Luke Wallace from  Harlequins
 Henry Purdy from  Gloucester
 Louis Brown from  Old Elthamians

Players Out
 Nathaniel Titchard-Jones to  Birmingham Moseley
 Ben Palmer to  Birmingham Moseley
 Charlie Beech to  Doncaster Knights
 Biyi Alo to  Wasps
 Sam Tuitupou retired
 Phil Nilsen retired
 Jack Preece to  Hartpury College
 Tom Jubb to  Hartpury College
 Latu Makaafi to  Hull
 James Neal to  Hinckley
 Willie Priestley to  Cambridge
 Kwaku Asiedu to  Ampthill
 Louis Roach to  Birmingham Moseley
 Joe Lane to  Darlington Mowden Park
 Cameron Gray to  Chinnor
 Daniel Faleafa to  Austin Elite
 Isaac McNulty to  Ayr
 Henry Purdy to  Bristol Bears
 Dave Brazier released
 Tarik Tin released

Doncaster Knights

Players In
 Matt Smith from  Yorkshire Carnegie
 Sam Olver from  Ealing Trailfinders
 Charlie Beech from  Coventry
 Jack Roberts from  Cardiff Blues
 Andrew Foster from  Yorkshire Carnegie
 Cameron Cowell from  Newcastle Falcons
 Pete Lucock from  Yorkshire Carnegie
 George Edgson from  Ealing Trailfinders
 Reiss Cullen from  Bristol Bears
 Kyle Evans from  Merthyr
 Marc Thomas from  Yorkshire Carnegie

Players Out
 Josh Tyrell to  Oyonnax
 Will Owen to  Coventry
 Richard List retired
 Paul Jarvis to  Doncaster Phoenix
 Mat Clark to  Nottingham
 Elliott Creed to  London Scottish
 David Nelson to  Darlington Mowden Park
 Paul Jarvis to  Darlington Mowden Park
 Willie Ryan to  Chinnor
 Toby Williams to  Rotherham Titans
 Marc Thomas to  Harlequins

Ealing Trailfinders

Players In
 Craig Trenier from  Richmond
 Steven Shingler from  Mont-de-Marsan
 Nathan Fowles from  Edinburgh
 Jack Tovey from  Bristol Bears
 Craig Hampson from  Wasps
 Paul Davis from  Exeter Chiefs
 Shane Buckley from  Nottingham
 Paul Grant from  Bath
 Tommy Bell from  London Irish
 Dave McKern from  Jersey Reds
 Oli Robinson from  Northumbria University
 Jack Rouse from  University of Exeter
 James Cannon from  Connacht
 Josh Pieterese from  University of Exeter
 Ewan Fenley from  Gloucester
 Cameron Terry from  Gloucester
 Ryan Roach from  Birmingham Moseley
 Elijah Niko from  Yorkshire Carnegie
 Harry Seward from  Cardiff Metropolitan University
 Adam Korczyk from  Queensland Reds

Players Out
 Sam Olver to  Doncaster Knights
 George Simpson to  Hartpury College (season-long loan)
 Ben Betts to  Nottingham (season-long loan)
 George Edgson to  Doncaster Knights
 Luke Carter to  Hartpury College
 Jordan Onojaife to  Bedford Blues
 Segundo Tuculet to  Los Tilos
 Will Harries to  Chinnor
 Mark Tampin to  Newcastle Falcons
 Laurence May to  Chinnor
 Max Davies to  Darlington Mowden Park
 Howard Packman to  North Otago
 Guy Armitage to  London Broncos
 Matt Beesley to  Wharfedale
 Rohan O'Regan to  Sydney University
 Ryan Foley released
 Ben Landry released
 Jack O'Connell released
 Ben Williams released

Hartpury College

Players In
 Jack Preece from  Coventry
 George Simpson from  Ealing Trailfinders (season-long loan)
 Luke Carter from  Ealing Trailfinders
 Tom Jubb from  Coventry
 Seb Nagle-Taylor from  Rotherham Titans
 Joshua Bragman from  University of Northumbria
 Sam Goatley from  Clifton
 Dan Koster from  Cornish Pirates
 Will Safe from  Gloucester

Players Out
 Ben Foley to  Nottingham
 Sam Leeming to  Bedford Blues
 Simon Linsell to  Gloucester
 Ed Sheldon to  Cinderford
 Luke Boon to  Old Elthamians
 Aquile Smith to  Birmingham Moseley
 Will Biggs to  Birmingham Moseley

Jersey Reds

Players In
 Liam Howley from  Southland
 Liam Hallam-Eames from  Manawatu
 Alex Thompson from  Ulster
 Luc Jones from  Richmond
 Dan Richardson from  Rotherham Titans
 George Spencer from  Edinburgh Academical
 Antonio Harris from  Wasps
 George Willmott from  Jersey Athletic
 Brendan Cope from  Yorkshire Carnegie
 Greg Dyer from  Valladolid RAC
 Tom Williams from  Cardiff Blues
 Josh Bainbridge from  Yorkshire Carnegie
 Sam Offer from  Western Force
 James Wayland from  Southern Districts

Players Out
 Brett Herron to  Harlequins
 Nick Selway to  Chinnor
 Dave McKern to  Ealing Trailfinders
 Sam Rodman to  Cornish Pirates
 Jerry Sexton to  Southern Kings
 Josh Hodson to  Chinnor
 Adam Batt to  Old Elthamians
 George Eastwell to  Old Elthamians
 Cameron Holenstein to  Old Elthamians
 Jason Worrall to  Chinnor
 Charlie Maddison to  Newcastle Falcons
 Graham Geldenhuys to  Ayr
 Koch Marx released
 Hilton Mudariki released

London Scottish

Players In
 Lewis Wynne from  Glasgow Warriors
 James Malcolm from  Glasgow Warriors
 Ollie Allsopp from  Birmingham Moseley
 Luke Hibberd from  Caldy
 Matt Gordon from  Easts Tigers
 Harry Sheppard from  Bedford Blues
 Dan Barnes from  Rosslyn Park
 Xavier Valentine from  Leeds Beckett University
 Kyle Whyte from  Bayonne
 Elliott Creed from  Doncaster Knights
 Alex Toolis from  Kurita Water Gush
 Matthew Davies from  Clifton
 Ryan Eveleigh from  Leeds Beckett University
 Charlie Gowling from  Beziers
 Will Magie from  Glendale Raptors
 Mike Te'o from  San Diego Legion

Players Out
 Rory Jennings to  Coventry
 Richie Vernon retired
 Grayson Hart to  Bedford Blues
 Tjiuee Uanivi to  Massy
 Richard Palframan to  Worcester Warriors
 Theo Vukasinovic to  Wasps
 Henari Veratau retired
 Ben Mosses to  Stade Niçois
 Dino Waldren to  San Diego Legion
 Peter Austin to  Birmingham Moseley
 Jared Saunders to  Old Elthamians
 Matt Marley  to  Chinnor
 Jimmy Litchfield to  Richmond
 Byron Hodge to  Richmond
 Will Magie to  Austin Gilgronis
 Bradley Clements released
 Matt Davidson released
 Mike Te'o to  San Diego Legion

Newcastle Falcons

Players In
 Greg Peterson from  Bordeaux
 Josh Basham from  Durham University
 Darren Barry from  Worcester Warriors
 Gareth Owen from  Leicester Tigers
 Toby Salmon from  Exeter Chiefs
 Mark Tampin from  Ealing Trailfinders
 Jamie Blamire promoted from Academy
 Adam Radwan promoted from Academy
 Simon Uzokwe promoted from Academy
 Cooper Vuna from  Bath
 Sebastian de Chaves from  London Irish
 Philip van der Walt from  Sharks
 Charlie Maddison from  Jersey Reds
 Mike Daniels from  Nottingham

Players Out
 Sami Mavinga to  Stade Francais
 Andrew Davidson to  Glasgow Warriors
 Pedro Bettencourt to  Oyonnax
 Will Witty to  Exeter Chiefs
 Glen Young to  Harlequins
 Cameron Cowell to  Doncaster Knights
 Ryan Burrows to  Coventry
 Ruaridh Dawson to  Cornish Pirates
 Calum Green to  Leicester Tigers
 Santiago Socino to  Jaguares
 Simon Hammersley to  Sale Sharks
 Chris Harris to  Gloucester
 Zach Kibirige to  Wasps
 Mark Wilson to  Sale Sharks (season-long loan)
 Vereniki Goneva to  Harlequins
 Tevita Cavubati to  Harlequins
 Josh Matavesi to  Bath Rugby
 Sonatane Takulua to  Toulon
 Tom Penny to  Harlequins
 Jack Payne released
 David Wilson released
 Sebastian de Chaves to  London Irish

Nottingham

Players In
 Ben Foley from  Hartpury College
 Tom Hill from  Yorkshire Carnegie
 Ben Betts from  Ealing Trailfinders (season-long loan)
 Billy Walker from  Saracens
 Mat Clark from  Doncaster Knights
 Harry Strong from  Exeter Chiefs
 Alex Dolly from  Rotherham Titans
 Jesse Liston from  Richmond
 Tom Benjamin from  Cardiff Metropolitan University
 James Connolly from  Connacht
 Ifereimi Boladau from  British Army
 Callum Allen from  Gloucester

Players Out
 Shane Buckley to  Ealing Trailfinders
 Joe Cobden retired
 Billy Robinson retired
 James Penman retired
 Rory Burke to  Connacht
 Ben Davis-Moore to  Luctonians
 Jordan Coghlan to  Leicester Tigers
 Alex Goble to  Old Elthamians
 Darryl Veenendaal to  Ampthill
 Mike Daniels to  Newcastle Falcons

Yorkshire Carnegie

Players In
 Joe Ford from  Leicester Tigers
 Sione Faletau from  Bristol Bears
 James Flynn from  Sale Sharks
 Jake Brady from  Darlington Mowden Park
 Ben Sowrey from  Wharfedale
 Tom Varndell from  South China Tigers
 Conor Davidson from  Manly
 Alex Humfrey from  Manly
 Jarrid Els from  Heidelberger RK
 James Elliott from  Leeds Beckett University
 Trystan Lloyd unattached
 Andrew Lawson from  Harrogate
 Zach Kerr from  Bangor
 Ed Bloodworth from  Northumbria University
 Tom Whitehurst from  Esher
 Tim Bitirim from  Cambridge
 Elliot Turner from  Western Force
 James Robins from  Chester
 Joe Carlisle from  Old Elthamians
 Callum Bustin from  Bradford Bulls
 Lee Smith from  Bradford Bulls
 Ryan Shaw from  Hull KR

Players Out
 Richard Beck retired
 Matt Smith to  Doncaster Knights
 Chris Elder to  Chinnor
 Dan Temm to  Bedford Blues
 Andrew Foster to  Doncaster Knights
 Pete Lucock to  Doncaster Knights
 Brendan Cope to  Jersey Reds
 Tom Hill to  Nottingham
 Andy Forsyth to  Coventry
 Joe Buckle to  Coventry
 Cian Romaine to  Cornish Pirates
 Harry Davey to  Cornish Pirates
 Jake Ilnicki to  Seattle Seawolves
 Josh Bainbridge to  Jersey Reds
 Ollie Fox to  Bath
 Kieran Frost to  Rotherham Titans
 Sam Allan to  Rotherham Titans
 Tom Bullough to  Rotherham Titans
 Jean-Baptiste Bruzulier to  Cornish Pirates
 Antonio Kiri Kiri to  Cornish Pirates
 Fa'atiga Lemalu to  Cornish Pirates
 Craig Mitchell to  Cornish Pirates
 Marc Thomas to  Doncaster Knights
 Elijah Niko to  Ealing Trailfinders
 Sam Wolstenholme to  Wasps

See also
List of 2019–20 Premiership Rugby transfers
List of 2019–20 Pro14 transfers
List of 2019–20 Super Rugby transfers
List of 2019–20 Top 14 transfers
List of 2019–20 Major League Rugby transfers

References

2018-19
2019–20 RFU Championship